Martinsville High School Gymnasium, also known as the Glenn M. Curtis Memorial Gymnasium, is an historic high school gymnasium located at Martinsville, Morgan County, Indiana.  It was built in 1923–1924, and is a two-story, rectangular, steel frame building sheathed in brick and limestone with Romanesque Revival style design elements.  It measures 180 feet by 210 feet and features angled corners with parapet, a main entrance flanked by square towers, and a mansard roof.  It was named for basketball coach Glenn M. Curtis (1890-1958) in 1959.

It was listed on the National Register of Historic Places in 1981.

References

School buildings on the National Register of Historic Places in Indiana
Romanesque Revival architecture in Indiana
School buildings completed in 1924
Buildings and structures in Morgan County, Indiana
National Register of Historic Places in Morgan County, Indiana
1924 establishments in Indiana